The Battle of Manimangala was a Battle between the Pallavas and Chalukyas in the town of Manimangala in  642 AD. Manimangala is the first ever victory for the Pallavas against the Chalukyas and also the first of four successive defeats suffered by Pulakesin II.

Causes 

Following the accession of Narasimhavarman I in 630, the Pallavas began to grow in strength. To quell their rise, the Chalukya king Pulakesin II led a southern campaign defeating the Banas on his way to the Pallava kingdom. Pulakesin proceeded to the town of Manimangala, identified with the present-day Manimangalam, about 20 miles from the Pallava capital Kanchi where he was stopped by a strong Pallava army.

Events 

The Kuram plates note that Pulakesin II suffered a defeat and was forced to retreat pursued by the victorious Pallava forces.

Notes 

Manimangala
7th century in India
Chalukya dynasty
Pallava dynasty